Batagalla may refer to:

 Batagalla (7°15'N 80°40'E), a village in Sri Lanka
 Batagalla (7°22'N 80°34'E), a village in Sri Lanka